Schinia intrabilis is a moth of the family Noctuidae. It is found in North America, including California, Arizona, Nevada, Texas and Utah.

The wingspan is about 23 mm. Adults are on wing from March to April. There is one generation per year.

The larvae feed on Pluchea sericea.

External links
Images
Butterflies and Moths of North America
The Life History of Schinia intrabilis

Schinia
Moths of North America
Moths described in 1893